The 1983 Missouri Tigers football team was an American football team that represented the University of Missouri in the Big Eight Conference (Big 8) during the 1983 NCAA Division I-A football season. The team compiled a 7–5 record (5–2 against Big 8 opponents), finished in a tie for second place in the Big 8, and outscored its opponents by a combined total of 292 to 202. Warren Powers was the head coach for the sixth of seven seasons. The team played its home games at Faurot Field in Columbia, Missouri.

The team's statistical leaders included Eric Drain with 685 rushing yards, Marlon Adler with 1,603 passing yards, and George Shorthose with 483 receiving yards.

Following this season, Missouri went into a deep depression, enduring 13 consecutive losing seasons.

Schedule

Roster

References

Missouri
Missouri Tigers football seasons
Missouri Tigers football